Lipia Góra may refer to the following places:
Lipia Góra, Greater Poland Voivodeship (west-central Poland)
Lipia Góra, Pomeranian Voivodeship (north Poland)
Lipia Góra, Świętokrzyskie Voivodeship (south-central Poland)